Between October 1966 and March 1967 the Australia national rugby union team – the Wallabies – conducted a world tour on which they played five Tests and thirty-one minor tour matches. Under the captaincy of John Thornett they toured UK, Ireland, France and Canada winning nineteen matches, losing fourteen and drawing three. At one stage they failed to win in four successive matches although in the Test match against England they gave the home side its heaviest defeat in 16 years. The tour marked the climax of the successful "Thornett Era" of Australian Rugby, buoyed by the leadership skills of skipper John Thornett and the outstanding abilities of greats of the game like Ken Catchpole, Peter Johnson and Rob Heming. Dick Marks and Peter Crittle also toured and would later become among the most influential administrators of Australian rugby.

Leadership
Following their success on the 1963 Australia rugby union tour of South Africa, team managers Bill McLaughlin and Alan Roper, together with captain John Thornett and vice-captain Ken Catchpole again led the Wallaby tour squad. Manager Bill McLaughlin was a 1936 two Test cap Wallaby, who would later serve a term a President of the Australian Rugby Union. Alan Roper was the Assistant Manager, the traditional coaching role of the touring party. Roper had been a schoolboy coach at Riverview in Sydney in the 1950s but had coached at the top-level in Australia since at least 1962 having success with the 1963 Australia rugby union tour of South Africa and again against the Springboks in a two Test domestic series in 1965.

John Thornett an exceptional leader of men, was the squad captain. Thornett had at the tour's beginning already made 36 Test appearances for Australia, 15 as captain. He had been entrenched as Wallaby captain since 1962, leading the side more times than any player to that point in Australia's rugby history. He was making his eight Wallaby tour, his fourth as the team leader. With Thornett sidelined by illness early in the tour, the Wallabies were captained by half back Ken Catchpole in all but the French Test. Catchpole is considered Australia's greatest scrumhalf.

Manager: Bill McLaughlin
Assistant-Manager (Coach): Alan Roper 
Captain: John Thornett
Vice-Captain: Ken Catchpole

Players

31 players toured with the 5th Wallaby squad. The team set out with 30 players, however, hooker Ross Cullen was sent home after the third tour match and was replaced by Dick Taylor. The squad had three veterans of the 4th Wallaby Tour - fullback Jim Lenehan, forward Tony Miller and skipper John Thornett - and comprised the strong nucleus of players of the Thornett Era who had taken Australia to great heights, including scrumhalf Ken Catchpole, hooker Peter Johnson, lineout specialist Rob Heming and breakaways Jules Guerassimoff and Greg Davis. Young rising stars included John Brass and John Hipwell. A number of the players would continue on to influential roles in rugby administration, including centre Dick Marks and forward Peter Crittle.

Early setbacks

After the Oxford University match – the 2nd match of the tour – Queensland hooker Ross Cullen was accused of biting the ear of Oxford front-rower Ollie Waldron. Waldron's ear needed treatment and McLaughlin acted to ban Cullen from the tour as punishment. Cullen was put on the next flight to Sydney and never played for his country again. The side was further rocked when skipper John Thornett contracted impetigo in a scrum, and dropped himself for the first Test.

Matches of the Tour
Scores and results list Australia's points tally first.

Test matches

Wales

AUSTRALIA: Jim Lenehan, Alan Cardy, Dick Marks, John Brass, Stewart Boyce, Phil Hawthorne, Ken Catchpole (c), Jim Miller, Peter Johnson, Tony Miller, Ross Teitzel, Rob Heming, Michael Purcell, Greg Davis, John O'Gorman.  

WALES: Terry Price, Stuart Watkins, John Dawes, Gerald Davies, Dewi Bebb, Barry John, Allan Lewis, Denzil Williams, Norman Gale, John Lloyd, Brian Price, Delme Thomas, Ken Braddock, Haydn Morgan, Alun Pask (c).

Scotland

AUSTRALIA: Jim Lenehan, Stewart Boyce, Dick Marks, John Brass, Alan Cardy, Paul Gibbs, Ken Catchpole (c), Jim Miller, Peter Johnson, Tony Miller, Ross Teitzel, Peter Crittle, Michael Purcell, Greg Davis, John O'Gorman.  

SCOTLAND: Stewart Wilson, Sandy Hinshelwood, Jock Turner, Brian Simmers, David Whyte, David Chisolm, ALex Hastie, Norm Suddon, Frank Laidlaw, David Rollo, Peter Stagg, Peter Brown, James Fisher (c), Derrick Grant, Alasdair Boyle.

England

The Test marked Australia's best performance of the tour. With their halves Phil Hawthorne and Ken Catchpole in control the Wallabies gave England its heaviest defeat in 16 years.

AUSTRALIA: Jim Lenehan, Alan Cardy, Dick Marks, John Brass, Stewart Boyce, Phil Hawthorne, Ken Catchpole (c), John O'Gorman, Jules Guerassimoff, Greg Davis, Ross Teitzel, Peter Crittle, Roy Prosser, Peter Johnson, Jim Miller  

ENGLAND: Roger Hosen, Keith Savage, Colin McFadyean, Christopher Jennins, Peter Glover, Richard Sharp (c), Clive Ashby, Phil Judd, George Sherriff, Budge Rogers, Dick Greenwood, Peter Larter, Mike Davis, Stephen Richards, Mike Coulman

Ireland

Ireland's first try was scored by Alan Duggan from a crossfield kick by Rea. A drop-goal followed by Ireland's Gibson from broken play deep in Australia's territory. Kiernan soon after kicked a penalty from out wide following an Australian infringement. Gibson followed with another drop-goal after a scrum close to the Australian line. Five minutes before half-time Hawthorne responded in kind and put the Wallabies on the board. The 3–9 scoreline at the break reflected Ireland's first-half dominance.

Australia pressed Ireland for a period after the break but a defensive lapse saw Gibson swoop for Ireland. Then the Australian back-line chimed and Boyce scored in the corner. Jim Lenehan kicked a tremendous conversion from the sideline putting Australia back in the match with the score 8–12. Ireland withstood the Australian effort in the final minutes before Gibson again showed coolness under pressure kicking another dropped goal for a 15–8 victory to Ireland.

AUSTRALIA: Jim Lenehan, Alan Cardy, Dick Marks, John Brass, Stewart Boyce, Phil Hawthorne, Ken Catchpole (c), John O'Gorman, Jules Guerassimoff, Greg Davis, Ross Teitzel, Peter Crittle, Roy Prosser, Peter Johnson, Tony Miller  

IRELAND: Tom Kiernan, Alan Duggan, Barry Bresnihan, Harold Rea, Paddy McGrath, Mike Gibson, Brendan Sherry, Philip O'Callaghan, Ken Kennedy, Thomas Moroney, Willie-John McBride, Mick Molloy, Mick Doyle, Noel Murphy (c), Ken Goodall

France

AUSTRALIA: Jim Lenehan, Stewart Boyce, Dick Marks, John Brass, Alan Cardy, Phil Hawthorne, Ken Catchpole, John Thornett (c), Peter Johnson, Tony Miller, Ross Teitzel, Rob Heming, Jules Guerassimoff, Greg Davis, John O'Gorman.  

FRANCE: Jean Gachassin, Bernard Duprat, Jean-Pierre Mir, Claude Dourthe, Christian Darrouy (c), Guy Camberabero, Lilian Camberabero, Jean-Claude Berejnoi, Jean-Michael Cabanier, Arnaldo Gruarin, Benoît Dauga, Walter Spanghero, Michel Sitjar, Christian Carrère, André Herrero

Touring party
Tour Manager: Bill McLaughlin
Assistant Manager : Alan Roper
Captain: John Thornett
Vice-captain : Ken Catchpole

Squad

Published sources
 Howell, Max (2005) Born to Lead – Wallaby Test Captains, Celebrity Books, Auckland NZ

External links

 Sometimes the Best Ever: The Story of the 1966/7 Wallabies (Part 1) documentary by Theo Clark Media, 2017 (YouTube)
 Randwick and the 1966/7 Wallaby Tour documentary by Theo Clark Media, 2017 (YouTube)

References

 

1966-67
1966-67
1966-67
1966-67
1966-67
1966-67
1966–67 in European rugby union
1966–67 in English rugby union
1966–67 in Welsh rugby union
1966–67 in Scottish rugby union
1966–67 in French rugby union
1966 in Australian rugby union
1967 in Australian rugby union
1966–67 in Irish rugby union